Koffman is a surname. Notable people with the surname include:

Elliot Koffman (born 1942), computer scientist and educationist
Laura Koffman (born Laura Bonarrigo in 1964), American actress
Moe Koffman (1928–2001), Canadian jazz saxophonist and flautist

See also
Kofman